Latexo Independent School District is a public school district based in Latexo, Texas, in the U.S. state of Texas. In addition to serving the city of Latexo, it also serves unincorporated north-central Houston County and a small portion of the nearby city of Crockett.

The district has two campuses - Latexo High (grades 7–12) and Latexo Elementary (prekindergarten-grade 6).

In 2009, the school district was rated "academically acceptable" by the Texas Education Agency.

History
In 2020 the district began designating Fridays as "flex days".

References

External links
Latexo ISD

School districts in Houston County, Texas